Ahmed Al-Juwaid (born 3 February 1995) is a Saudi Arabian professional footballer who plays as a midfielder for Saudi Pro League club Al-Hazem.

Career
Al-Juwaid started his career at Al-Omran and spent four seasons at the club. On 16 January 2019, Al-Juwaid joined Al-Rawdhah. He made 8 appearances as Al-Rawdhah earned promotion to the Second Division by finishing as runners-up in the 2018–19 Third Division. On 10 July 2019, Al-Juwaid joined MS League side Al-Nojoom. He spent two seasons at the club and left following their relegation. On 8 July 2021, Al-Juwaid signed a three-year deal with Pro League side Al-Hazem. He made his debut on 12 August 2021 in the 3–3 draw against Al-Taawoun.

Honours
Al-Rawdhah
Saudi Third Division runners-up: 2018–19

References

External links
 
 

1995 births
Living people
Saudi Arabian footballers
Association football midfielders
Saudi Fourth Division players
Saudi First Division League players
Saudi Professional League players
Al Omran Club players
Al-Rawdhah Club players
Al-Nojoom FC players
Al-Hazem F.C. players